Hippasteria is one of 70 genera of sea star in the diverse family Goniasteridae.

Description and characteristics 
These sea stars are regular, five-armed starfishes, with a large and flattened central disc. 
Most of the species in this genus live in deep seas, where they seem to be predators of deep sea coral and cnidarians.

The species Hippasteria phrygiana may be one of the most widely distributed species : it is present in the 3 main oceanic basins.

List of species
According to the World Register of Marine Species (WoRMS), the genus Hippasteria is composed of the following twelve species:
 Hippasteria californica Fisher, 1905
 Hippasteria falklandica Fisher, 1940
 Hippasteria heathi Fisher, 1905
 Hippasteria imperialis Goto, 1914
 Hippasteria leiopelta Fisher, 1910
 Hippasteria lepidonotus (Fisher, 1905)
 Hippasteria magellanica Perrier, 1888
 Hippasteria mcknighti Mah, Neill, Eleaume & Foltz 2014
 Hippasteria muscipula Mah, Neill, Eleaume & Foltz 2014
 Hippasteria nozawai Goto, 1914
 Hippasteria phrygiana (Parelius, 1768)
 Hippasteria tiburoni Mah, Neill, Eleaume & Foltz 2014

Bibliography

References